Regena Thomas is the former Secretary of State of New Jersey and a political consultant. She served in the cabinets of former Gov. James McGreevey and former Gov. Richard Codey.

Secretary Thomas worked in state government in Kentucky and local government in the District of Columbia. She became an expert on political consulting and in voter turnout for Democratic candidates. Her work led to founding her own political consulting firm and she has a history working with statewide candidates in New Jersey. She handled get out the vote efforts for the 1996 U.S. Senate campaign of Rep. Robert Torricelli, the 2000 U.S. Senate campaign of Jon Corzine and McGreevey's 2001 campaign for governor. She also worked on Corzine's 2005 campaign for governor.

After McGreevey's 2001 election, he appointed Thomas to a four-year term as Secretary of State. As Secretary of State, Thomas held responsibility for the state archives, cultural affairs, minority affairs, volunteerism, Native American affairs, literacy, state history, and record keeping. McGreevey reportedly considered transferring state elections to the Secretary of State from the New Jersey Attorney General's office, but received criticism because of Thomas' background in political consulting. State elections administration had been under the secretary of state until former Gov. Christine Todd Whitman transferred it to the attorney general.

During Thomas' tenure, she received criticism from state lawmakers for taking time off and for what they considered to be political work from her state office. Thomas said she did any political work in her spare time and in 2004 she took a multimonth leave of absence to "recharge her batteries."  Thomas also spent part of this leave working on the presidential campaign of Massachusetts Sen. John Kerry and North Carolina Sen. John Edwards. It was reported that Thomas was interested in becoming United States Ambassador to Haiti if Kerry had won the 2004 presidential election.

As a part of Thomas' official duties as secretary of state, she was charged with accepting McGreevey's resignation in November 2004. Thomas left office in January 2006 when her four-year constitutionally mandated term expired.

National Democratic Committee
Thomas was promoted to director of community engagement, while continuing her current role as political department senior adviser in 2014.

References

External links

Year of birth missing (living people)
Living people
People from Kentucky
Secretaries of State of New Jersey
New Jersey Democrats
African-American people in New Jersey politics
African-American state cabinet secretaries